Magician's End is a 2013 fantasy novel by American writer Raymond E. Feist, the third book in his The Chaoswar Saga trilogy and the 30th, and final, book in his Riftwar Cycle series.

Synopsis
An uneasy quiet has settled upon Midkemia in the wake of a surprise invasion. But the land is far from peaceful. Leaderless, the Kingdom is on the brink of anarchy and civil war, unless Hal conDoin, Duke of Crydee, and his brothers can rally their allies to crown a new king. They must move quickly, for war has left the land vulnerable to an agency of horrific destruction not of this world. No one is safe, not even the Star Elves whose city deep in the Grey Tower Mountains has come under attack by an ancient darkness that seeks to extinguish every living thing in Midkemia. Yet the bravery of determined warriors—brothers in blood and arms—is not enough to ensure the Kingdom's preservation without the magic of the Master Sorcerer Pug. A powerful spell has trapped him, his son Magnus, and two unlikely allies in an unfamiliar realm, and they must find their separate ways home—a journey of memory and discovery that will illuminate the truth of the destiny that awaits them. But to save Midkemia—and everything he has fought for and all he cherishes—Pug will have to pay the ultimate price.

References

2013 American novels
2013 fantasy novels
Novels by Raymond E. Feist
HarperCollins books